Kim Hwa-jip (Hangul: 김화집, Hanja: 金和集; 26 May 1905 – 8 July 2006) was a South Korean football player and manager.

He was one of seven winners of the South Korea Football Hall of Fame, along with Kim Yong-sik, Hong Deok-young, Lee Hoe-taik, Cha Bum-kun, Guus Hiddink, and Chung Mong-joon.

References

External links

1900s births
Kyungsung FC players
South Korean footballers
South Korea international footballers
2006 deaths
Association football defenders